José Sátiro do Nascimento (born 3 April 1979, in Palmeira dos Índios), also known as Índio, is a former Brazilian footballer who plays as a full back.

References

1979 births
Living people
Brazilian footballers
Brazil under-20 international footballers
Brazilian expatriate footballers
Association football forwards
Sport Club Corinthians Paulista players
Goiás Esporte Clube players
Esporte Clube Santo André players
Esporte Clube Vitória players
Sociedade Esportiva e Recreativa Caxias do Sul players
Pohang Steelers players
Daegu FC players
PAOK FC players
Club Alianza Lima footballers
Esporte Clube Noroeste players
Clube do Remo players
Super League Greece players
K League 1 players
Expatriate footballers in Peru
Expatriate footballers in South Korea
Expatriate footballers in Greece
Brazilian expatriate sportspeople in South Korea
Saad Esporte Clube players